The eighteenth season of the reality show singing competition American Idol premiered on February 16, 2020, on ABC. It is the third season to air on ABC since the series reboot; Katy Perry, Luke Bryan, and Lionel Richie returned as judges despite budget cuts. Ryan Seacrest continued as show host; Bobby Bones returned as in-house mentor.

Taping was suspended after the Top 21 were revealed, and the contestants were sent home, due to the COVID-19 pandemic. The show resumed production in late April, with the on-air talent and contestants filming from their homes. The stay-at-home and social-distancing mandates, according to Billboard, compelled producers "to get very, very creative this time around to keep season 18 afloat amid the most challenging conditions in show history". Up to forty-five remote sites were used, and each contestant treated equally, with similar equipment and resource access. Segments were taped usually a day in advance, except for judges' reactions and voting results, which aired live.

On May 17, 2020, Just Sam was crowned as the winner, with Arthur Gunn finishing as the runner-up. With Sam's win, she became the fourth African-American female to win the show, after Fantasia, Jordin Sparks, and Candice Glover. Sam is also the second female to win the competition since the show had relaunched on ABC, and the seventh overall.

Preliminary auditions 

  This venue was for registration.
  This venue was for the audition.

Regional auditions

Hollywood Week 
Hollywood Week was filmed December 2–5, 2019, at the Orpheum Theatre in Los Angeles, California. There were several changes this season. Instead of the usual concepts of Hollywood Week with Lines of Ten, Group Rounds, and Solo Round, this season the 167 contestants faced the Genre Challenge. The contestants chose from genres given, Pop, Rock, R&B, Soul, Country, and Singer-Songwriter, and picked a song and were assessed amongst their group. After all  performed, the judges brought the contestants to stage, similar to Lines of Ten, and made their decision. The Group Round was replaced with a Duet Round, in which the remaining contestants picked a duet partner and their song from a list provided. They were given twelve hours to rehearse including a session with a vocal coach, and later, a stage rehearsal. The judges decided if one, both, or neither moved to the Solo Round for which the remaining contestants performed with a backing band. The Top 40 were flown to Hawaii for a Showcase round to determine the Top 20 advancing to the live shows.

Showcase Round 
The Showcase Round aired on March 29 and April 5, featuring the top forty performing for the judges and a live audience at Aulani resort in Kapolei, Hawaii. The following day, the judges narrowed the number of contestants down to twenty in the Final Judgment. The following is a list of the contestants who performed, the song they performed at the Showcase, and if they advanced or not. The placements of Grace Leer and Lauren Mascitti were determined by a vote.

Color key:

  The placements of Grace Leer and Lauren Mascitti were revealed on Sunday, April 19.

Remote shows 
Color key

Week 1: Top 20 (April 26)

Week 2: Top 11 Homeward Bound (May 3) 
The Top Ten was determined by viewer votes—and the judges were given a one-time Judges Save which they used to add an additional singer.

Week 3: Top 7 Disney Night/Mother's Day (May 10) 
The remaining seven contestants were asked to perform Disney songs and a song dedicated to their mothers.

Week 4: Finale (May 17) 
Color key

Elimination chart 
Color key

Ratings

References

External links

American Idol seasons
2020 American television seasons
Television series impacted by the COVID-19 pandemic